Zheleznyak is a gender-neutral Slavic surname. Notable people with the surname include:

Sergei Zheleznyak (born 1970), Russian Member of Parliament
Yakiv Zheleznyak (born 1941), Soviet sport shooter 

Russian-language surnames